Benoit Cotnoir is a Canadian former ice hockey defenseman who was an All-American for Notre Dame.

Career
Cotnoir began his tenure with the ice hockey team at Notre Dame in 1995. In his first two years he proved to be a steady defender for a bad team. The fortunes of the Fighting Irish changed in his junior season and Cotnoir benefitted by nearly doubling his point production. As a senior he helped the team post its first winning season in 9 years and was named an All-American. While his numbers were never eye-popping, Cotnoir was nevertheless able to carve out a brief career as a professional. He played three years in the ECHL before heading to England in 2002. The trial lasted just 11 games and he finished out the year in Quebec. He spent most of his final year as a player with the Macon Trax in the WHA2.

After his playing career, Cotnoir remained in Georgia and matriculated to Georgia Tech, earning an MBA in 2006. During his studies, he interned with Lafarge, a French industrial company, and then joined their marketing department after graduating. He worked his way up the company ladder and is currently an Area Sales Manager (as of 2021).

Personal life
Benoit's cousin, Pier-Olivier, played college hockey at Norwich.

Statistics

Regular season and playoffs

Awards and honors

References

External links

1975 births
Living people
AHCA Division I men's ice hockey All-Americans
Canadian ice hockey defencemen
Ice hockey people from Quebec
People from Rouyn-Noranda
Notre Dame Fighting Irish men's ice hockey players
Mobile Mysticks players
Richmond Renegades players
Basingstoke Bison players
Augusta Lynx players